Roald Øyen (born 12 September 1940) is a Norwegian television host and television personality for NRK. Øyen joined NRK in 1962 and hosted the programme Bit for bit, bilde for bilde (Bit by Bit, Frame by Frame) and has commentated for Norway in the Eurovision Song Contest in 1968, 1972 and 1984, in addition Øyen gave out the Norwegian Result in the Eurovision in 1963, 1980, 2001 and 2003.

Since 1968 he has been married to Nina Bugge.

References

External links
 

1940 births
Living people
Norwegian television presenters
NRK people